The Cowan's mantella (Mantella cowanii)  is a species of frog in the family Mantellidae.
It is endemic to Madagascar.
Its natural habitats are subtropical or tropical moist montane forests, subtropical or tropical high-altitude grassland, and rivers.
It is threatened by habitat loss. Collection for the pet trade has also been a threat.

Sources

Mantella
Endemic frogs of Madagascar
Amphibians described in 1882
Species endangered by the pet trade
Species endangered by subsistence agriculture
Species endangered by deforestation
Species endangered by logging for charcoal
Species endangered by wetland drainage
Species endangered by urbanization
Taxonomy articles created by Polbot